Gabriel Vendages de Malapeire (1624-1702) was a French aristocrat, parliamentarian and poet. He wrote Marian poetry and built a chapel in Toulouse.

Early life
Gabriel Vendages de Malapeire was born in 1624. His father was a parliamentarian.

Career
Vendages de Malapeire was a courtier to the King of France. He was a member of the Acadèmia dels Jòcs Florals. In 1688, he co-founded the Société des Belles-Lettres de Toulouse with Adrian Martel, a lawyer. The society was discontinued in 1699.

Vendages de Malapeire wrote poetry about the Virgin Mary. In 1671, he patronized the construction of the Notre-Dame-du-Mont-Carmel chapel in Toulouse. It was dedicated in 1678. He authored a description of the chapel in 1692, including the paintings he had commissioned for it.

Death and legacy
Vendages de Malapeire died in 1702. His chapel was destroyed in 1806.

References

1624 births
1702 deaths
Writers from Toulouse
French Catholic poets